Euphaedra rezia, the Rezia Ceres forester, is a butterfly in the family Nymphalidae. It is found in Cameroon, Gabon, the Republic of the Congo and possibly Nigeria. The habitat consists of forests.

The larvae feed on Pancovia species.

Similar species
Other members of the Euphaedra ceres species group q.v.

References

Butterflies described in 1866
rezia
Butterflies of Africa
Taxa named by William Chapman Hewitson